Keramoti is a town and a former municipality in the Kavala regional unit, East Macedonia and Thrace, Greece. Since the 2011 local government reform it is part of the municipality Nestos, of which it is a municipal unit. The municipal unit has an area of 115.095 km2. As of the 2011 census, the municipal unit had a population of 5,115, and the town had a population of 1,438. Originated as a small fisherman's village of Greek immigrants from Asia Minor, today Keramoti is a picturesque little sea resort with a sandy beach, several small hotels and a lot of vacation rentals.

Gallery

References

Populated places in Kavala (regional unit)